Seung Yu is an American educator and as of 2020, principal of Stuyvesant High School, one of the elite public schools in New York City.

Previously, he was Senior Executive Director of the Office of Postsecondary Readiness (OPSR) at the Department of Education. Prior to that in 2017, he was the founding principal at the Academy for Software Engineering (AFSE), a high school near Union Square that prepared students for careers in computer science.

References 

Living people
Year of birth missing (living people)